Macallan Lake is a lake located on Vancouver Island west  of Kennedy Lake  and south  of Kennedy River.

See also
List of lakes of British Columbia

References

Alberni Valley
Lakes of Vancouver Island
Clayoquot Land District